Alfredo Ferrari (nicknamed Alfredino or Dino; 19 January 1932 – 30 June 1956) was an Italian automotive engineer and the first son of automaker Enzo Ferrari. He was diagnosed with Duchenne muscular dystrophy, and died at the age of 24. After his death, Ferrari named the car fitted with the engine that Alfredo was working on at the time of his death "Dino" in his honour.

Early life 

Born to Enzo Ferrari and his wife Laura Dominica Garello, on 19 January 1932, Alfredo was named after his paternal grandfather. 

Enzo, who at the time was a racing driver for Alfa Romeo, had vowed to stop racing cars if he had a son. He kept his promise, and retired from driving in 1932, concentrating on racing team management with the newly-formed Scuderia Ferrari.

From an early age, Enzo groomed Alfredino, "little Alfredo", to be his successor. Alfredo studied economics in Bologna before moving to mechanical engineering in Switzerland.

Career at Ferrari 

In his short career at Ferrari, Alfredo was widely credited for the 750 Monza racing car; and, to a limited extent, a 1.5-litre V6, the Ferrari Dino engine, that would later see action in Ferrari's early Formula Two racers. Alfredo suggested to his father the development of a 1.5-litre DOHC V6 engine for F2 at the end of 1955. Two years later in 1957, to honour his son, Enzo named the Dino series of racing sports cars using this V6 engine after him. Road cars under the same marque soon followed.

Gino Rancatti, a friend of Dino's father, Enzo Ferrari, noted: "Dino, though he suffered because of his health, had always played an active part in the Ferrari company. He was interested in everything, but it was perhaps engines that interested him the most."

Death 
During his time at Ferrari, Alfredo started experiencing health problems. His physical movements gradually became stiff, and he was often unable to maintain his balance. At his return to Modena, he was diagnosed with Duchenne muscular dystrophy. In the final days of his life, while hospitalized, he discussed technical details of the 1.5-litre V6 with fellow engineer Vittorio Jano and his father, Enzo Ferrari; Enzo remarked on Dino's "intensity, intelligence, and attentiveness". Alfredo would never see the engine; he died in Modena on 30 June 1956, at the age of 24.

Enzo Ferrari later said of caring for Dino in the final months leading up to his death:

The death of Alfredo took a toll on his parents' marriage. His mother, Laura Dominica Garello, never got over the loss of her only son, and her behaviour became increasingly erratic and unstable.

Piero Ferrari, Dino's younger half-brother who was born out-of-wedlock to Enzo Ferrari and mistress Lina Lardi on 22 May 1945, and who became Enzo's heir after Dino's death, has stated: "I never knew Dino, but I have never felt I was a victim of his memory, or of the pain that my father, Enzo, had always felt because of his death. And I would not be sincere if I did not say that when I was recognized [in 1978, after Laura's death], I experienced a great deal of emotion."

Gino Rancati, a long-time friend of Dino's and Piero's father, Enzo Ferrari, said: "Piero is now a man, with a family of his own, but his father [Enzo]'s obsession with Dino's memory must have left a mark on him."

Legacy 

Dino Ferrari is probably best-known posthumously for designing the Ferrari Dino engine, a series of V6s and V8s that were produced by Ferrari from the late 1950s into the early 2000s; and the Dino, a marque best known for mid-engined, rear-drive sports cars produced by Ferrari from 1957 to 1976. 

The marque came into existence in late 1956, with a front-engined Formula Two racer powered by a brand new Ferrari Dino V6 engine. The name "Dino" was also used for some models with engines smaller than 12 cylinders, it was an attempt by the company to offer a relatively low-cost sports car. The Ferrari name remained reserved for its premium V12 and flat-12 models until 1976, when "Dino" was retired in favor of full Ferrari branding.

Alongside engineer Vittorio Jano, Dino persuaded his father, Enzo Ferrari, to produce a line of racing cars in the 1950s with V6 and V8 engines. The script that adorns the badge and cylinder head covers was based on Dino's own signature.

In 1962, Enzo Ferrari launched the Premio Giornalistico Dino Ferrari (the Dino Ferrari Prize for Journalism) in memory of his son, originally with a prize of 500,000 lira. The prize money was later increased to 1 million lira, in a addition to a small bronze statuette of the Ferrari emblem, the Prancing Horse. Writers Gino Rancati, Giovanni Arpino, and Alberto Bevilacqua, among others, have been recipients of this annual award.

The Autodromo Enzo e Dino Ferrari in Imola, Italy was originally named the "Autodromo Dino Ferrari" in Alfredo's honour, with his father's name added after Enzo's death in 1988. The 1979 Dino Ferrari Grand Prix was held there on 16 September 1979.

Dino's half-brother, Piero, also actively supports Centro Dino Ferrari,  a research center for neurodegenerative and muscular diseases at the University of Milan, located in the Clinical  Neurology Institute at the University Polyclinic of Milan. The center was named after Dino, and co-founded by their father, Enzo Ferrari, with Prof. Guglielmo Scarlato (1931 – 2002) in 1978.

References

Notes 

1932 births
1956 deaths
Engineers from Modena
Ferrari people
Italian automobile designers
Deaths from muscular dystrophy
Italian motorsport people
Neurological disease deaths in Emilia-Romagna